Silvestre Antonio Guzmán Fernández (February 12, 1911 – July 4, 1982), best known as  Antonio Guzmán, was a Dominican businessman and a politician. He was President of the Dominican Republic, from 1978 to 1982.

Early life 
Antonio Guzmán was born in the town of La Vega. He studied in the primary and secondary schools of La Vega.

He worked in the fruit exportation business and soon became a wealthy rancher as well.

An early member of Juan Bosch’s Dominican Revolutionary Party, he served as secretary of agriculture in Bosch's brief 1963 administration. In May 1966 he was the vice-presidential candidate for the PRD, with Bosch as the candidate for president. The elections were won, however, by Joaquín Balaguer.

He ran for president in 1974 as the candidate of a united opposition ticket. However, he pulled out after Balaguer changed the rules in a way that the opposition felt was unfair and undemocratic.

Presidency 
Guzmán ran for president again in 1978 as the PRD candidate, with Jacobo Majluta as his running mate. When election returns showed an unmistakable trend in Guzmán's favor, the military stopped the count. However, amid vigorous protests at home and strong pressure abroad, the count resumed. When the returns were all in, Guzmán handed Balaguer the first loss of his electoral career. When Balaguer left office that year, it marked the first time in the Dominican Republic's history that an incumbent president peacefully surrendered power to an elected member of the opposition.

Guzmán's political plan was to move slowly to reform the social and economic aspects of the Dominican Republic, while he tried to have direct contact with the armed forces because of their threat concerning pressure in the political field. To directly attack the last problem, he implemented a program that reassigned or even removed officers who were skeptical of his plans and also promoted younger officers who stood behind Guzmán. This new program also called for an institution for more formal training for officers and personnel that enlisted in the armed forces.  This program proved to be a great success, and it was a major part of the legacy Guzmán left behind.

Politically though, there was not a lot Guzmán could do because he was restrained to some extent since the majority of Congress consisted of Balaguer's Reformist Party—which gave them benefits when it came to vetoing the different reforms Guzmán wished to launch. Since Guzmán was a wealthy cattle rancher—he knew how to implement well-mapped economic policies.  He also helped make the nation's public transportation system better and increased minimum wage. But even though Guzmán made many reforms that were beneficial to the country, he was still criticized for not responding to the economic decline. One big event that made the criticism even stronger was Hurricane David that hit in 1979, which slowed the economy even more.

End of Presidency 

Early in June 1982, Hipólito Mejía, who was running to become senator for the Santiago Province, was told that the president was not feeling well and that he should pay him a visit. Hipólito had a good relationship with the president, who had appointed him Minister of Agriculture in 1978. Upon arriving Hipólito found Guzmán sitting on the beach crying, next to his horse. Something that Hipólito, and everyone else, knew was very out of character in a president with a very strong and vibrant personality. When Hipólito inquired, Guzmán told him he was worried about the country's future. That same day Hipólito told Renée Klang Avelino, the president's wife, that he was worried about Guzmán, but Renée dismissed it telling him not to worry, her husband a valiant and fearless leader, and that there was nothing wrong with him. Three days later the president had dinner at Hipólito's house. There Hipólito's wife noticed that the president was acting very out of character and that he looked somewhat untidy. After listening to his wife's concerns, Hipólito visited a psychiatrist friend who told him that the president may be suffering from depression. Hipólito would not have any of this of course, he knew his friend very well and told the psychiatrist that "Guzman basically invented anti-depression". But the psychiatrist replied with a stern warning. "Hipólito, depression is a cursed illness. Be very careful". It is very likely that the president was suffering from depression but kept it from everyone, even his wife. Furthermore, even if he had acknowledged it, he was the type of person that would have never taken medications for it. According to Hipólito, that's the kind of person he was.

About a month later, on July 4, 1982, Hipólito was awakened at 4 am by a phone call from his cousin. Antonio Guzmán had shot himself. Vice-President Jacobo Majluta became acting President and ruled for the remaining 43 days of the four-year term.

References

External links 
Hipólito Mejia interview regarding Antonio Guzmán's death (end of presidency {Spanish})
International Jose Guillermo Carrillo Foundation
 The New York Times

1911 births
1982 deaths
People from La Vega Province
Dominican Revolutionary Party politicians
Politicians who committed suicide
Presidents of the Dominican Republic
Suicides by firearm in the Dominican Republic
Dominican Republic people of Spanish descent
Heads of state who committed suicide
White Dominicans